Murdan (also Romanized as Mūrdan) is a village in Jakdan Rural District, in the Central District of Bashagard County, Hormozgan Province, Iran. At the 2006 census, its population was 11, in 5 families.

References 

Populated places in Bashagard County